Youssef Abdalla (born 16 March 1998) is an Egyptian swimmer. He competed in the men's 100 metre backstroke event at the 2017 World Aquatics Championships.

References

1998 births
Living people
Egyptian male swimmers
Place of birth missing (living people)
Male backstroke swimmers